Jürgen Schütze (3 March 1951 – 6 September 2000) was an East German racing cyclist, who won the bronze medal at the 1972 Summer Olympics. He competed for the SC Dynamo Berlin / Sportvereinigung (SV) Dynamo.

References

1951 births
2000 deaths
People from Arnsdorf
East German track cyclists
East German male cyclists
Olympic medalists in cycling
Cyclists from Saxony
Olympic cyclists of East Germany
Cyclists at the 1972 Summer Olympics
Medalists at the 1972 Summer Olympics
Olympic bronze medalists for East Germany
People from Bezirk Dresden